John B. Williams Jr. (born February 27, 1941, in New York City) is an American double-bassist and bass guitarist.

Career
Williams studied percussion before switching to bass as a member of the United States Marine Corps. He studied under Ron Carter, then joined Horace Silver's group in 1967, remaining with him until 1969. He performed and recorded extensively in the late 1960s and early 1970s in jazz settings, including with Mose Allison, Roy Ayers, Count Basie, Kenny Burrell, Dizzy Gillespie, Bobby Hutcherson and Harold Land, Hugh Masekela, Zoot Sims, Clark Terry, Leon Thomas, and Kai Winding.

Williams joined band of The Tonight Show in 1972. In the mid-1970s he worked with Benny Carter and Billy Cobham, then worked with Michael Wolff in a trio setting (1978–1983). Other associations in the 1980s included Carl Burnett, Art Farmer and Benny Golson, Jon Hendricks, Paul Humphrey, Gerald Wilson, and Nancy Wilson. He returned to play with Wolff in the house band for The Arsenio Hall Show (1989–1993), and continued working with Wolff into the late 1990s.

References
"John Williams (v)". The New Grove Dictionary of Jazz. 2nd edition, ed. Barry Kernfeld.

American jazz double-bassists
Male double-bassists
Musicians from New York City
1941 births
Living people
American jazz bass guitarists
American male bass guitarists
20th-century American bass guitarists
Jazz musicians from New York (state)
21st-century double-bassists
20th-century American male musicians
21st-century American male musicians
American male jazz musicians